
Gmina Wiązownica is a rural gmina (administrative district) in Jarosław County, Subcarpathian Voivodeship, in south-eastern Poland.

Villages
Gmina Wiązownica contains the villages and settlements of Cetula, Manasterz, Mołodycz, Nielepkowice, Piwoda, Radawa, Ryszkowa Wola, Surmaczówka, Szówsko, Wiązownica, Wólka Zapałowska and Zapałów.

Neighbouring gminas
Gmina Wiązownica is bordered by the town of Jarosław and by the gminas of Adamówka, Jarosław, Laszki, Oleszyce, Sieniawa and Stary Dzików.

References

Polish official population figures 2006

Wiazownica
Jarosław County